Pobočník Jeho Výsosti is a Czech comedy film directed by Martin Frič. It was released in 1933.

Cast
 Vlasta Burian as 2nd Lt. Alois Patera
 Nora Stallich as Princ Evzen
 Suzanne Marwille as Princezna Anna Luisa
 Jaroslav Marvan as Plukovník
 Bedrich Vrbský as Kinzl, podplukovník
 Helga Nováková as Pepina Kalasová
 Ela Sárková as Bardáma
 Alexander Trebovský as Guth, policejní rada
 František Kreuzmann as Paces, sikovatel
 Frantisek Cerný as Kuchar u posádky v Mnuku
 Marie Grossová as Císnice u Maxima
 Ladislav Hemmer as Richard Mádr, rytmistr

References

External links
 

1933 films
1933 comedy films
Czechoslovak black-and-white films
Films directed by Martin Frič
Czechoslovak multilingual films
Czechoslovak comedy films
1933 multilingual films
1930s Czech films